Kaspar Kornelius Mortaigne de Potelles (1609 – 10 July 1647 Sankt Goar) was a Flemish General-Lieutenant who fought during the course of the Thirty Years' and Hessian Wars.

Biography
Mortaigne was born in 1609, to a Flemish Lutheran family. Mortaigne became a squire of Prince Philipp, son of Maurice, Landgrave of Hesse-Kassel, while he was pursuing a military education in the Netherlands. On 17 August 1626, Philipp was killed while fighting for the Protestant side at the Battle of Lutter. Following his master's death Mortaigne entered the service of Sweden, becoming colonel in 1637. The course of the Swedish intervention into the Thirty Years' War was abruptly interrupted in the aftermath of the 10 May 1641 death of  Johan Banér, the commander of the Swedish expeditionary force.

Mortaigne became a leader of a large scale mutiny which paralyzed the Swedish army, demanding the immediate payment of their arrears. In July 1641, Mortaigne and Adam von Pfuhl were invited into Stockholm as representative of the mutineers. Mortaigne was promoted into brigadier general and received land in Pomerania, while the rest of the army was paid the sum of 486,200 thalers settling the crown's debts. During the course of 1642, Mortaigne was severely injured during an engagement in the vicinity of Brieg and took later part in the second Battle of Breitenfeld. In 1643, Mortaigne's forces ravaged through Moravia. On 12 February 1645, he was captured by an Imperial patrol outside Borna while carrying a portfolio of important documents. He was released on ransom, later commanding the Swedish center at the Battle of Jankau. In 1646, he returned to the Landgraviate of Hesse-Kassel with the approval of Christina, Queen of Sweden, receiving the rank of general-lieutenant. He led Hesse-Kassel's troops during the Hessian War. On 10 July 1647, a cannonball crushed his left leg, gravely wounding him  while  he was besieging the  Rheinfels Castle.

Notes

References

 
 

1609 births
1647 deaths
Swedish Army generals
Flemish soldiers
Swedish nobility
Military personnel of the Thirty Years' War
Prisoners of war
South Netherlandish people of the Thirty Years' War